Atlantic Club may refer to:

Atlantic Club of Bulgaria, Bulgarian think tank
Atlantic Club Casino Hotel, former casino resort in Atlantic City, New Jersey
Atlantic Club Ridge, landform in Antarctica